45 Street station is a CTrain light rail station in Calgary, Alberta, Canada. It opened for revenue service on December 10, 2012. On December 8, 2012, a preview of the West Line was provided.

The station is located in a trench on the north side of 17 Avenue SW and west of 45 Street SW, 5.3 km West of the 7 Avenue & 9 Street SW Interlocking.  No park & ride is provided and the station is a walk-on only with passengers arriving by Calgary Transit buses, cycling, walking or by vehicle drop off. The platforms are side-loading with grade-level access at the west end and stairs and ramps at the east end. The station serves the neighborhoods of Glendale, Rosscarrock, Westgate and Glenbrook. It is located immediately adjacent to the Calgary main office of the Alberta Motor Association, as well as a district Calgary Police Service station.

45 Street along with 69 Street are the first trenched stations to be built in Calgary.

In its first year of service, 45 Street served an average of 3,630 boardings per day.

References

CTrain stations
Railway stations in Canada opened in 2012
2012 establishments in Alberta